This is a list of contestants who have appeared on the television series, The Amazing Race Asia. Contestants with a pre-existing relationship form a team and race around the world against other teams to claim a grand prize of USD100,000. In total, 102 contestants comprising 51 teams of 2 have competed in the series.

Contestants
The teams are arranged based on their placings and the team members are arranged based on the opening intro. Age appearing are during time of filming.

Contestant deaths
Henry Reed (53), May 21, 2013

Gallery

See also
List of The Amazing Race Asia winners

Notes
 Originally from the United Kingdom.
 Originally from South Korea.
 Originally from New Zealand.
 Originally from Singapore.
 Originally from France.
 Originally from the United States.
 Originally from Canada.
 Originally from Australia.
 Originally from Hungary.

References
Official website

Amazing Race Asia contestants, The